The New Mexico shrew (Sorex neomexicanus) is a species of mammal in the family Soricidae. It is found only in New Mexico in the Capitan and Sandia-Manzano Mountains.

It weighs . It was included in Sorex monticolus until 1996. It is distinguished from Sorex monticolus by its teeth. The row of unicuspid teeth is longer in Sorex neomexicanus than in Sorex monticolus, and Sorex neomexicanus has a wider space between its first upper unicuspid and second upper unicuspid (going from front to back) than Sorex monticolus does.

References

Sorex
Mammals described in 1913
Endemic fauna of New Mexico